O Olho Mágico do Amor is a 1982 Brazilian film directed by José Antônio Garcia and Ícaro Martins.

Cast 
Carla Camurati	...	Vera / secretary
Tânia Alves	...	Penélope / prostitute
Ênio Gonçalves	...	Átila / Penélope's gigolo
Sérgio Mamberti	...	Prolíxenes / Vera's boss
Tito Alencastro	...	Nelson
Walter Casagrande	...	Himself

References

External links 
 

1982 films
1980s Portuguese-language films
1982 comedy-drama films
Brazilian comedy-drama films
Best Picture APCA Award winners